Lote Maharashtra Industrial Development Corporation (MIDC) area is located in the Khed taluka, in the Ratnagiri district of Maharashtra state in India. It is adjacent to Dhamandevi village. They export to the Americas and Europe.

Factories in Lote are predominantly in the chemical industry and include:
Kansai Nerolac Paints 
Gharda Chemicals Ltd
NOCIL (Taken over by Dow Chemical Company)
Pentokey Organy (India) Ltd
Bhavana Petrochem Pvt. Ltd
Parco Pharmaceutical and Chemicals
Shireen Industries
Ratnagiri Chemicals Pvt. Ltd.
S. R. Drugs
Indian Oxalate Ltd.
Kokan Synthetics & Chemical Pvt.Ltd
Eltech Fine Chem Pvt.Ltd
Filtra Catalysts & Chemicals Ltd
Arpit Investment P.Ltd
Dow Agrosciences India Pvt Ltd
Sandvik
Aimco Pesticides Limited
Hindustan Unilever Limited
Parshwa Biotech LLP
Excel Industries Limited
Dorf Ketal

References

Companies based in Maharashtra
Year of establishment missing